is a Japanese manga series written and illustrated by Kentaro Miura. Set in a medieval Europe-inspired dark fantasy world, the story centers on the characters of Guts, a lone swordsman, and Griffith, the leader of a mercenary band called the "Band of the Hawk". Miura premiered a prototype of Berserk in 1988. The series began the following year in the Hakusensha's now-defunct magazine Monthly Animal House, which was replaced in 1992 by the semimonthly magazine Young Animal, where Berserk has continued its publication. Following Miura's death in May 2021, the final chapter that he wrote and illustrated was published posthumously in September of the same year; the series resumed in June 2022, under supervision of Miura's fellow manga artist and childhood friend  and Miura's group of assistants and apprentices from Studio Gaga.

Berserk was adapted into a 25-episode anime television series by OLM, which covered the Golden Age story arc, and was broadcast from October 1997 to March 1998. The Golden Age arc was also adapted into a trilogy of theatrical anime films; the first two films premiered in 2012 and the third film premiered in 2013. A second 24-episode anime television series adaptation was broadcast for two seasons in 2016 and 2017.

By October 2022, the Berserk manga had over 55 million copies in circulation, including digital versions, making it one of the best-selling manga series of all time. It received the Award for Excellence at the sixth installment of the Tezuka Osamu Cultural Prize in 2002. Berserk has been widely acclaimed, particularly for its dark setting, storytelling, characters, and Miura's detailed artwork.

Plot

Guts is a lone warrior who was born from a hanged corpse and raised as a mercenary by his abusive adoptive father Gambino. It came to a head when Guts was forced to kill a drunk Gambino in self-defense, fleeing his mercenary group and becoming a wandering sellsword. His fearsome reputation catches the attention of Griffith, the charismatic leader of a mercenary group known as the Band of the Hawk. Griffith forces Guts to join the group after defeating him in battle, with Guts becoming his best fighter and main confidante. The Band is hired by the kingdom of Midland to help in its century-long war against the Chuder Empire. Guts learns of Griffith's desire to rule a kingdom of his own and his mysterious pendant known as a Behelit. The Behelit is instrumental when they are spared by Nosferatu Zodd, a monstrous immortal who leaves Guts with a cryptic warning of a painful demise for being Griffith's friend.

As Griffith mingles with Midland nobility while acquainting himself with the king's daughter Charlotte, Guts begins developing feelings for his fellow commander Casca, the Hawks' only female member. Upon overhearing Griffith confessing to Charlotte that he only considers someone with their own dream as a friend, Guts decides to leave the group once Midland has won its war so he can find his own dream. Guts' decision inadvertently causes Griffith to fall into an emotional spiral that culminates in his arrest for seducing Charlotte in a moment of weakness. He loses his Behelit while subjected to endless torture, and the Hawks are declared criminals by the Midland army. Guts, having spent a year training to become a better swordsman, is warned by a mysterious being known as the "Skull Knight" that his actions have instigated an "Eclipse". Learning of the Hawks' predicament, Guts rejoins them to rescue Griffith, while also consummating his feelings for Casca. 

Despite a successful rescue while fleeing to Midland’s borders, the Hawks learn Griffith became physically incapable to lead them as they, Casca, and Guts determine how to proceed. When Griffith regains his Behelit while injuring himself during a solar eclipse, the pendant uses his blood to establish a temporary convergence of the physical world and the supernatural astral realm in the form of a hellscape. The Hawks encounter a quartet of archdemons known as the "Godhand" who have gathered for a ritual known as the Eclipse, revealing that Griffith has been chosen to become their final member and can only transcend his humanity if he offers his comrades as sacrificial offerings. Griffith accepts once reminded of the person he has always been. The Hawks are branded with demonic sigils, marking them for sacrifice and are subsequently slaughtered by the Godhand's Apostles—humans like Zodd who attained power by sacrificing their loved ones and humanity. Only Guts and Casca survive the massacre, but Griffith's first act as the being Femto is to rape Casca in front of Guts, with an enraged Guts losing his left forearm and right eye in his attempt to save her. They are rescued by the Skull Knight, but the ordeal traumatizes Casca enough to regress her mind to a childlike state. Guts learns from the Skull Knight that their "Brands of Sacrifice" makes them targets for specters and other beings of darkness on a nightly basis. Guts leaves Casca in the care of the blacksmith Godo, his adoptive daughter Erica, and Rickert, the last and youngest member of the Band of the Hawk, who survived by not being present at the Eclipse. Godo outfits Guts with a giant new sword, "Dragonslayer", and a prosthetic left arm with a built-in cannon and crossbow. Guts begins hunting down the Apostles to find and kill Griffith while followed by a demonic phantom called the Demon Child, which is actually Guts' and Casca's unborn child deformed by Femto's rape.

Two years later, after having killed many Apostles and earning the nickname of "the Black Swordsman", Guts is joined by an elf named Puck. They are captured by Farnese, captain of the Holy See Church's Holy Iron Chain Knights, who believes Guts is a foretold harbinger of the apocalypse. Guts escapes after saving Farnese from specters, returning to an ailing Godo while learning that Casca wandered off. His search for her takes him to the refugee-infested city of St. Albion, a city the Godhand have prepared as the site for an Incarnation ceremony to give one of their own a physical form. Guts saves Casca from the fanatical Holy See bishop Mozgus as the city descends into nightmarish chaos from the souls of the dead attacking. Joined by Farnese, her bodyguard Serpico, and a young thief named Isidro, Guts and Casca survive the ordeal as a misshapen apostle living under St. Albion ingests the dying Demon Child and uses its body to reconstitute Griffith into a physical form.

Guts encounters Griffith and Zodd at Godo's home and they engage in battle; the nearby enchanted mine, which sheltered Casca from the nightly demon attacks, is destroyed by Zodd while Griffith realizes some lingering traces of the Demon Child persist within him. To try and find a means of restoring her mind, Guts decides to journey with Casca to Puck's homeland of Elfhelm, on the island of Skellig. He allows Isidro, Farnese and Serpico to follow him out of fear that he will lose control of himself to his dark impulses—embodied as a demonic black dog within his mind—with Farnese becoming Casca's primary caretaker. At the same time, Griffith creates a second Band of the Hawk with Zodd and other Apostles to save Midland from the invading Kushan Empire, led by their rogue Apostle emperor, Ganishka.

Guts' group encounters the witch Flora and her apprentice Schierke while saving a village from marauding trolls. Schierke begins to teach Farnese magic and dampens the effects of the sacrificial brands on Guts and Casca via magical seals. Flora gives Guts a dangerous relic known as the Berserker Armor, which increases his physical capability with the added risk of being consumed by his inner darkness. Flora is later killed when the New Band of the Hawk destroy the tree she made her home in. After escaping the destruction of Flora's home, during a full moon, Guts' party encounters Moonlight Boy, a small boy who does not speak but expresses a fondness for Guts and Casca. The boy disappears after the full moon passes. While Guts and his party secure a ship called the Seahorse, captained by Farnese's erstwhile fiancée, Prince Roderick, to reach Elfhelm amidst a Kushan attack on the port, Griffith's war with Ganishka reaches its climax; the emperor is destroyed following his transition into a god-like abomination that causes a worldwide overlapping of the mortal and astral realms. Unopposed and with Charlotte and the Holy See's blessing, Griffith establishes the city of Falconia to provide refuge for Midlanders and the rest of humanity from the numerous mythical creatures that manifested when the realms merged.

After a dramatic battle with a supernatural island-sized monster known as the Sea God and recruiting a merrow girl named Isma, Guts' party reaches Elfhelm. The elf ruler, Danann, helps Farnese and Schierke travel into Casca's mind and restore her to her former self. Despite her recovery, Casca is still traumatized from her ordeal to the point of finding it difficult to be around Guts without remembering the events of the Eclipse. Farnese and Schierke begin training with the other apprentice witches and wizards living on Skellig, the former taking an interest in the power to heal human souls to help Casca. At the same time, the Skull Knight tells Guts his journey is at an end, introduces him to the creator of the Berserker Armor, and explains his own past with the Godhand and its leader Void. The Moonlight Boy appears on Elfheim during a full moon. Danann senses no malice from the child and he is allowed to stay, forming a mother-son bond with Casca. It is revealed that Moonlight Boy is the Demon Child, who can take control of the body Griffith resides in during a full moon. Griffith regains control of his host when day breaks and unnerves Guts with his inability to harm him before Zodd arrives. Griffith proceeds to abduct an incapacitated Casca while killing the island's giant spirit tree. The tree's destruction not only unleashes a torrent of evil spirits that nearly submerge the island, but also cause Danann, Isma and the other magical creatures, except Puck and Ivalera, to disappear into the Astral Realm. The survivors sail off on the Seahorse, defeated with their only advantage against Griffith gone. Guts breaks down in despair as a whirlpool begins to draw in the ship. Meanwhile, Griffith and Zodd return to the mainland with Casca.

Production

Development
While briefly working as an assistant to George Morikawa at 18, Miura had already planned some ideas for Berserks development, having a dark warrior with a gigantic sword illustrated in his portfolio who would be the first conception of Guts. Miura submitted manuscripts to a shōnen manga magazine for about four years before working for Hakusensha. However, he felt that he was not capable enough for it and they were also not interested in publishing science fiction or fantasy works. In 1988, while working with Buronson on a manga titled King of Wolves, Miura published a prototype of Berserk in Hakusensha's Gekkan ComiComi. This 48-page prototype placed 2nd at the 7th ComiComis Manga-School prize. He later submitted his work to a magazine that, at the time, "was on the verge of going under," and he was switched around between several editors before meeting his first editor. The serialization of Berserk began in Hakusensha's Monthly Animal House in 1989. Miura commented that he landed the serial as soon as he made his debut, so he never had the opportunity to receive much criticism from editors.

Concept and influences
Miura stated that the inspiration for the series' title was diffuse at the time of creation. He did not have information about the berserkers or the Berserker Armor (which first appeared in the 222nd chapter) planned out from the start. He chose the word, telling himself that "its mysterious aspect would stick well." Miura said that the title was connected to Guts' imagery, influenced by Mad Max's eponymous character, further elaborating: "In short, starting from a world with a dark hero who is burning for revenge, prompts you to imagine a rabid character. When, guided by his anger, he will pour out this rage on overpowered enemies, we must insist on his fanaticism if you want to stay consistent. That's why I thought "Berserk" would make a perfect title to represent my universe." According to Miura, the series' dark fantasy setting was inspired by the 1982 film Conan the Barbarian and the Elric of Melniboné series. Miura stated that he did not see dark fantasy as a genre in itself, but rather as an equivalent of general fantasy. He commented that outside of Japan the big works of fantasy, like The Lord of the Rings, contain dark elements, and in Japan, the fantasy genre was popularized by video games like Dragon Quest, which were aimed at children, and therefore, expurgated the dark elements, but since he received the influence from novels before that of those games, Miura "naturally turned to dark fantasy."

Miura said that Fist of the North Star, by Buronson and Tetsuo Hara, was the work that had the greatest impact on his own work, helping as well to develop his art style. Miura also mentioned animator and manga artist Yoshikazu Yasuhiko and manga artist Fujihiko Hosono as early influences to his art style. Violence Jack by Go Nagai and Guin Saga by Kaoru Kurimoto inspired the series' story and atmosphere.  by Masatoshi Uchizaki served him as a reference for his backgrounds. Miura said that his favorite manga series was Dororo by Osamu Tezuka, and that he wanted to create a fantasy work that possessed dark, "muddy" and yōkai-like elements. Miura was also influenced by Star Wars, adding that he learned the basics of storytelling from George Lucas and called the eponymous 1977 film his favorite work. Miura commented about the influence of shōjo manga on the series, stating that it is about "expressing every feeling powerfully." Particularly, he mentioned influence from Yumiko Ōshima, and that the anime adaptations of The Rose of Versailles and Aim for the Ace!, both directed by Osamu Dezaki, inspired him to read The Rose of Versailles manga and the works of Keiko Takemiya, mainly Kaze to Ki no Uta.

Some aspects of Guts (personality and design) were partially inspired by Miura's highschool friend and later fellow manga artist , by Mad Max, and by Rutger Hauer's performances in Flesh and Blood, Blade Runner, The Hitcher and The Blood of Heroes. Guts' prosthetic hand was inspired by Dororos Hyakkimaru and Cobra eponymous protagonist. Miura commented that when drawing the Dragon Slayer, he wanted to emulate the effect of Kenshiro's or Raoh's (Fist of the North Star) fist "flying out from the page," but he felt that Guts' sword did not have the same feeling of weight as a fist. He wanted to convey an "extension of reality" feel to the sword, similar to the depiction of the Fist of the North Stars Hokuto Shinken martial art, and make it believable for the readers. Miura stated that "Black Swordsman" Guts was the first thing he was set on, but he did not have any idea about what his backstory would be. He focused on the character development up until around the third or fourth volume and then he would think about what brought him to revenge.

Frequency
Berserk is known for its frequent and often extended hiatuses, which date back to late 2006. Following a pause, three consecutive chapters about Guts' childhood were published from June 8 to July 13, 2012; the main storyline resumed eight months later on October 12, and the series went on hiatus after a chapter published on December 28 of the same year. Miura took a break to work on his six-chapter mini-series Giganto Maxia, and Berserk was published intermittently from April 11 to September 26, 2014. After a 10-month hiatus, the manga resumed on July 24, 2015, and was published monthly until November 27 of the same year, before entering on hiatus. It was published monthly from June 24 to September 23, 2016, before entering another hiatus. The manga resumed publication from March 24 to June 23, 2017, and was then published on a monthly basis from December 22 of the same year to May 25, 2018.<ref></p></ref> Four months later, another chapter was published on August 24, 2018, before entering an eight-month hiatus. Two chapters were published on April 26 and August 23, 2019. Three chapters were published on April 24, July 22, and October 23, 2020, respectively. The last chapter published in Miura's lifetime was released on January 22, 2021.

Miura's death and series resumption
On May 20, 2021, Hakusensha announced that Miura died at 54 due to an acute aortic dissection on May 6, leaving it undecided what would happen to the series. The posthumous 364th chapter of Berserk was published in Young Animal on September 10 of the same year, which was Miura's last work, and members of Miura's Studio Gaga, which consisted of him and his group of assistants and apprentices, worked to finish the manuscript of the chapter. The magazine's issue was a "memorial" to Miura, featuring a special "Messages to Kentarou Miura" booklet and a poster of "famous scenes" from the manga. In the same issue, Hakusensha stated that the future of the series remained uncertain and that the staff's priority would "always be placed on him—what he would think if he were still with us." The afterword in the manga's 41st volume (released in December 2021) from Young Animals editorial staff stated that the future of the manga was still undecided.

On June 7, 2022, Hakusensha and Kouji Mori announced that the series would continue publication, using plans and thoughts that were relayed to Mori by Miura himself, as well as memorandums and character designs that Miura left behind. Mori related how he had visited Miura nearly 30 years ago when the latter was drawing "the Eclipse" event of Berserk and how his friend completed the storyline for the manga up to its last chapter that week. Mori explained that the story for Berserk had since gone on "exactly as we discussed at the time, with almost no changes." As the only person who knows the ending Miura intended, Mori agreed to continue the series and promised, "I will only write the episodes that Miura talked to me about. I will not flesh it out. I will not write episodes that I don't remember clearly. I will only write the lines and stories that Miura described to me." Berserk has continued with the credits appearing as "original work by Kentaro Miura, art by Studio Gaga, supervised by Kouji Mori". The "Fantasia Arc/Elf Island Chapter" finished with six chapters (including the 365th and 366th chapters published in the same issue) released from June 24 to December 9, 2022, with a new arc set to start afterwards.

Themes
Berserk explores a wide range of themes and topics. Free will, destiny, and causality are discussed within the series.  Human resilience is a recurring theme, with many characters coming from traumatic backgrounds, constantly struggling against an unjust world. Guts struggles with destiny itself and is constantly resisting the pull of predetermination. Griffith also embodies this idea of resilience, by chasing his dream of ruling his own kingdom, despite his lowborn origins, as well as free will, by his own decision to sacrifice the Band of the Hawk in order to achieve his dream.

The series also explores human nature and morality, as characters struggle between becoming good human beings or falling into madness and evil. Guts, at the beginning of the story, is presented as an antihero who does not care about killing and is indifferent to people who aid him. Guts does not act in accordance with definitions of right and wrong, he operates within a gray area, and does not attempt to be heroic or protect the innocent. However, as the story progresses, it is shown that he is in fact a person who is deeply conflicted internally. His tragic and traumatic past, unfolded in the Golden Age arc, proves that Guts is a much more complex character. Anne Lauenroth of Anime News Network wrote that Griffith is "not evil at all," but "arrogant and brutally realistic about human nature." The suppression of his own human nature would initiate his demise as the Hawk and the rise of Femto.

Friendship, comradery and human relations are other explored themes. As a child, Guts tried to build some level of friendship with his mercenary group, but due to his traumatic experience with them, he lost trust in people. However, through the time he was with Griffith and the rest of the Band of the Hawk, Guts formed bonds, friendships, animosities and co-dependencies, maturing as well as individual. Miura stated that he based the Band of the Hawk on his own high school friend relationship experience. Specifically, he mentioned that his friendship with later fellow manga artist Kouji Mori partially inspired the relationship between Guts and Griffith. Jacob Chapman of Anime News Network, wrote that through their friendship, Guts' ambitions were elevated and Griffith's were lowered, allowing both of them to consider a new future for the first time, one where they fight side by side as equals and die on the battlefield, but they reject this future out of their own personal fears, as Guts did not think he was "good enough" for a happy future and Griffith was terrified of his lofty dream crumbling into something more mundane. Miura also said that the conflict between Guts and Griffith speaks about their change after having built their personalities.

The Golden Age arc has been compared to a Greek tragedy. According to Lauenroth, Griffith's hamartia lies in how he compartmentalizes his feelings of guilt and shame that would get in the way of his dream and how he deals to repress them. His inner dialogue in his second duel with Guts, "If I can't have him, I don't care," marks the Golden Age arc peripeteia. When Guts comes running to rescue him during the Eclipse, Griffith reaches his moment of anagnorisis with his thought: "You're the only one... who made me forget my dream."

Betrayal and revenge are major themes in the series. Guts suffered his first betrayal when Gambino sold Guts' body to another soldier for a few coins. He would eventually take revenge against the soldier, killing him on the battlefield and he later would kill Gambino as well. Guts is in a quest for revenge after his comrades were betrayed by Griffith and sacrificed by the God Hand. This desire for vengeance has been his main reason of survival.

Religion has been also touched in the series, mainly through the characters of Mozgus and Farnese. Miura stated that he created Mozgus based on the concept of rigid personality to create a religious fanatic character with no flexibility. Farnese is presented as the figurehead of the Holy Iron Chain Knights, inquisitors tasked with burning heretics and witches at the stake. After her encounter with Guts, she finds it increasingly difficult to resolve her faith with the atrocities she became party to, as Guts, inversely, takes action against something he disagrees with. Guts denounces the very idea of prayer, claiming that  the act of clasping hands only prevents people from fighting for their lives. Farnese eventually begins to reject her faith and the rigidity of her beliefs after finding out the truth about Mozgus. After the battle between Guts and Mozgus, Farnese decides to follow Guts, to find a new purpose in her life, away from her social position and the church.

Publication

Written and illustrated by Kentaro Miura, Berserk debuted in Hakusensha's  in August 1989 (October issue). Hakusensha published the first tankōbon volume of Berserk under its Jets Comics imprint on November 26, 1990. In 1992, Monthly Animal House was replaced by Young Animal, and Miura continued the series' irregular publication in the semimonthly magazine before his death in May 2021; the series resumed publication in June 2022, under supervision of Miura's fellow manga artist and childhood friend , with illustrations by Miura's group of assistants and apprentices from Studio Gaga. In June 2016, Hakusensha's Jets Comics imprint was rebranded as Young Animal Comics and the first thirty-seven volumes of Berserk were re-published with new cover arts. By December 24, 2021, 41 volumes have been published; the posthumous 41st volume came in both regular and special editions, the latter included special canvas art drawn by Miura and a drama CD.

In North America, Dark Horse Comics, in conjunction with Digital Manga Publishing, announced the license of the manga in 2003. The first volume was published on October 22, 2003. , 41 volumes have been published. In September 2018, Dark Horse Comics announced a deluxe edition of Berserk, featuring hard covers and larger prints, with the first volume (collecting original volumes 1–3) released on February 27, 2019. The 13th and latest volume (collecting original volumes 37–39) was released on March 8, 2023.

Related media

Anime

First series (1997–1998)

Berserk was adapted into a 25-episode anime television series, produced by Nippon Television and VAP, animated by Oriental Light and Magic, and directed by Naohito Takahashi. The first episode begins with the Black Swordsman arc and shifts into the Golden Age arc thereafter. It was broadcast in Japan on Nippon TV from October 8, 1997, to April 1, 1998.

Film series (2012–2013)

The Berserk Golden Age arc was adapted into a trilogy of theatrical anime films by Studio 4°C. The first film, The Egg of the King, premiered in Japan on February 4, 2012. The second film, The Battle for Doldrey, premiered in Japan on June 23, 2012. The third film, The Advent, premiered in Japan on February 1, 2013. A remastered television broadcast edition, labeled as "Memorial Edition", aired from October 2 to December 25, 2022.

Second series (2016–2017)

A second anime television series adaptation of Berserk was produced by Liden Films and animated by GEMBA and Millepensee. The series' 12-episode first season covered the manga's Conviction arc. It was broadcast on Wowow and MBS's Animeism anime programming block from July 1 to September 16, 2016. A 12-episode second season, which covered the first half of the manga's Falcon of the Millennium Empire arc, was broadcast from April 7 to June 23, 2017.

Video games

Two video games based on Berserk have been developed by Yuke's. The first game, was released for the Dreamcast in Japan by ASCII Corporation in late 1999. It was localized in western regions early the following year by Eidos Interactive.

The second game, was published by Sammy Corporation exclusively in Japan on the PlayStation 2 in 2004.

A Berserk-themed spin-off of Omega Force's Dynasty Warriors series, titled  was released on October 27, 2016, in Japan, and later in the U.S. on February 21, 2017, for PlayStation 4, PlayStation Vita and PC via Steam.

Dragon's Dogma featured armor sets from the Berserk: The Golden Age Arc films and Shin Megami Tensei: Liberation Dx2 made characters as they appeared in the 2016 TV series adaptation of Berserk playable. In December 2021, the MMORPG Lineage W announced a collaboration with Berserk, including the ability to play as Guts.

Novel
A spin-off novel, titled , written by Makoto Fukami with illustrations by Kentaro Miura, was released on June 23, 2017. It is focused on the past of the new Band of the Hawk's apostle Grunbeld. In North America, the novel was published in English by Dark Horse on April 17, 2019.

Other media
Five Berserk art books and one guidebook have been released by Hakusensha:
 , an art book about the 1997 anime, released on December 9, 1998.
 , released on August 20, 1998;
 , art book about the video game Sword of the Berserk: Guts' Rage, released on December 22, 1999.
 , was released by Hakusensha on September 23, 2016. It was published in North America by Dark Horse on September 19, 2018.
 The Artwork of Berserk was released for the 2021 Large Berserk Exhibition; it was sold exclusively during the event, but it announced later that it would be available for purchase after the event.

A trading card game was released by Konami in Japan in 2003 and 2004. Berserk has spurred a line of statues and action figures produced by Art of War, Prime 1 Studio and First 4 Figures. Various figma figures by Max Factory based on the characters have been released, including Guts (Black Swordsman version, Band of the Hawk version and Berserker Armor version), Griffith and Femto, Casca and the Godhand. Berserk inspired two pachinko machines that feature original CG animation.

With the publication of the 40th volume of the manga on September 18, 2018, a promotional video, featuring actor Shigeru Matsuzaki portraying Guts, was streamed.

, a special event to celebrate the 30th anniversary of Berserk, was announced in October 2020. It was originally scheduled to be held at Ikebukuro Sunshine City's Exhibition Hall A in Tokyo from January 30 to February 15, 2021. However, due to COVID-19 pandemic concerns, the event was postponed. The exhibition was held in Osaka from December 11, 2021, to January 30, 2022.

A drama CD, featuring the return of the 2016 anime's cast, portraying the "Awakening" chapter of the manga, was published with the special edition of the 41st volume of the manga on December 24, 2021.

Reception
The 1988 prototype chapter of Berserk placed second at the seventh ComiComis Manga-School prize. The manga was a finalist for the second, third, fourth, and fifth installments of the Tezuka Osamu Cultural Prize in 1998, 1999, 2000, and 2001, respectively. In 2002, Berserk earned Miura the Award for Excellence at the sixth installment of the Tezuka Osamu Cultural Prize, being awarded along with Takehiko Inoue, who won the Grand Prize for Vagabond. Berserk was one of the Manga Division's Jury Recommended Works at the fifth and sixth installments of the Japan Media Arts Festival Awards in 2001 and 2002, respectively. Berserk: Birth of the Black Swordsman, a 15-second video commercial for the 2016 anime television series adaptation, was one of the Entertainment Division's Jury Recommended Works at the 20th installment of the Japan Media Arts Festival Awards in 2017.

In 2016, Berserk ranked 38th on the 17th "Book of the Year" list by Da Vinci magazine; it ranked 44th on the 22nd list in 2022. On TV Asahi's Manga Sōsenkyo 2021 poll, in which 150,000 people voted for their top 100 manga series, Berserk ranked 91st.

In 2007, the manga received the prize of best seinen manga at the Japan Expo Awards. Berserk won the French AnimeLands Anime & Manga Grand Prix for Best Classic Seinen in 2008, 2009 and 2013. It won the Spanish Manga Barcelona award for the seinen category in 2013 and 2021.

Sales
Volumes 33–41 of Berserk debuted in the top six on Oricon weekly manga chart from 2008 to 2021; volumes 34 and 40 debuted first in 2009 and 2018, respectively. By July 2015, the manga had over 27 million copies in circulation in Japan and 8 million overseas; over 40 million copies in circulation by January 2016; over 50 million copies in circulation (including digital versions) by May 2021; and over 55 million copies in circulation (including digital versions) by October 2022. Berserk received an Excellence Award of Hakusensha's Denshi Shoseki Taishō (E-Book Award) in 2015, which went to the publisher's best-selling digital manga from July 1, 2014, to June 30, 2015; it won the same award in its 2021 edition, which went for the publisher's best-selling digital manga from January 1 to December 31, 2021.

In March 2017, Michael Gombos, Dark Horse Comics' director of international publishing and licensing, reported that Berserk was their best-selling product of all time (not just among manga), dethroning Lone Wolf and Cub, and it had over 2 million copies sold in North America by September 2018. Following Miura's death announcement in May 2021, it was reported that the first eight volumes of Dark Horse's deluxe edition of Berserk ranked on Amazon's top 100 overall best-selling books list. According to ICv2, Berserk was the 4th best-selling manga franchise for fall 2021 (September–December) in the United States, and it was also the 10th "most efficient manga franchise" for retailer bookshelves, based on the website's calculations of which manga franchises had the highest sales per volume. The first volume of Dark Horse's deluxe edition was one of the highest-selling manga volumes of 2022.

Critical reception
Berserk has been widely acclaimed by critics. Reviewing the first volume, Michael Aronson of Manga Life described Berserk as "a curious mix of medieval barbarism, sorcery and futurist technology, combining ghouls, guns and gore. The result is beautifully rendered badass action with enough bloody violence to keep fans of the genre happy." Publishers Weekly wrote: "Berserk offers a montage of merciless violence and thrilling action sequences in a blend of pure fantasy and graphic horror." Grant Goodman of Pop Culture Shock wrote: "Berserk redefines what is considered a well-written fantasy manga. There are few manga that come anywhere close to creating a complex tale that includes medieval warfare, magic, and horror." Reviewing the first two volumes, Greg McElhatton of Read About Comics wrote: "it's still hard to identify what about Berserk brings across such a fascination. Is it the characters? The visual look of the monsters? The little hints of a troubled past, like Guts' tattoo that oozes blood? All of the above? I'm not sure, but I do know that I'm hooked." In his review of the third volume, Daniel Briscoe of The Fandom Post called the series "a tragic story of hatred, violence, and innocence lost," adding that Miura "manages to pack so much emotion, both good and bad, next to so much violence and gore I believe is a testament to his writing and his artwork." In his review of the first six volumes, Satyajit Chetri of Rolling Stone wrote: "By the end of the fifth volume, Berserk has morphed into a touching tale of humanity, friendship and ambition. It is less about the blood spilt and more about the choices made by the characters, the small twists that will ultimately turn friends into nemeses." Reviewing the twelfth volume, Eduardo M. Chavez writing for AnimeOnDVD, commented that despite its long-running publication, "Berserk is as shocking and unique as ever this far into the series. There are few titles out there that can sustain the level of intensity and relevance as this." In his review of the twenty-first volume, Scott Cambpell of Active Anime wrote: "The deep, dark places that this manga travels to both in story and in artistic expression can be as interesting and captivating as they are horrifying," adding that the are not many other stories or manga quite like Berserk.

Writing for SciFi.com, Zac Bertschy said: "Kentaro Miura has managed to create a story that's not only darkly disturbing, but also absorbing and affecting on a deeper level than most manga titles can achieve." Bertschy praised the story and character development, concluding: "Not for the faint of heart, Berserk is perfect for mature manga fans who like a little blood with their drama." In Manga: The Complete Guide, author Jason Thompson gave Berserk 4 out of four stars. He called it "[a] blood-soaked sword-and-sorcery epic with elements of Clive Barker's Hellraiser," and wrote: "Berserks medieval European world of mud and blood is so realistic—and drawn in such realistic detail—that when dark fantasy elements begin to intrude upon it, they do so with a slow, dawning horror." Thompson, in a review for j-pop.com, also wrote: "Despite the slaughter, Berserk doesn't feel as amoral as it could be; our hero is a killer, but given his well-developed back story, his occasional tears of remorse seem more genuine than, say, Crying Freemans." In another article, writing for Anime News Network (ANN), Thompson said that Berserk started as "the story of a lone swordsman traveling the world fighting demons with blood and sweat," and it was later turned into a "fantasy RPG party of heroes with a magic-user, a thief, a fighter, some elves, etc.," commenting that Miura apparently was "aiming the series at a younger age group." Despite this, Thompson stated:  "I'm still impressed by Miura's great art and his ability to create such a long storyline with so much scope and (relative to other manga, at least) so little filler. No other seinen fantasy manga has such well-developed characters with such deep backstories, even for the minor characters." Matt Fagaly, writing for Crunchyroll, analyzed Berserks use of shōnen and shōjo manga tropes in the Lost Children arc (volumes 14–16), which resulted in an "entirely original and moving narrative." Fagaly commented about the arc protagonist, Jill, and her hopeful words at the end of that story, further adding: "I have never seen another Shonen or Shojo express this notion with the same audacity, depth, and idiosyncrasy as Berserk." Carl Kimlinger, writing for ANN, in his review of the thirty-fifth volume, compared Guts' "monster-plagued" trip to Elfhelm to the fantasy tales of Robert E. Howard and, in comparing the volume to the previous ones, he wrote that series dropped down a notch, although he stated that it was not a "disastrous drop," but "just the series falling back into a comfortable, classical adventure mode." Brittany Vincent of Otaku USA said: "Berserk is undoubtedly one of the most unique and engaging Western-style fantasies of all time." Writing for Syfy Wire, Eric Frederiksen said: "Berserk is one of the longest-running manga, and consistently one of the darkest out there, but also one of the most emotionally powerful and rewarding." Writing for Crunchyroll, Peter Fobian expressed: "Berserk is one of the most deeply personal works I've ever read, both for myself and in my perception of Miura's works. The series' transformation in the past 30 years artistically and thematically is so singular it's difficult to find another work that comes close."

Miura's artwork has been particularly praised by critics. Bertschy said that the artwork is where Berserk "really shines," adding: "The cross-hatching work, the level of detail, it's all stunning. Every page is a work of art, each scene drawn with the outmost attention to detail and atmosphere." He compared the art to the 1950s horror comics from EC Comics and found it fitting to the series' "gruesome nature." Bertschy concluded: "Miura is a fabulously talented artist and author, and future manga series by him will be met with great anticipation." Thompson said: "Miura's art is one of the real attractions. The people may occasionally look funky, but castles, knights, horses, and Baroque and Romanesque trappings are drawn with detail and accuracy." McElhatton wrote that he was "pretty unimpressed" with Miura's art at first, but he changed his mind after the demons appeared, stating: "Miura draws demons in such a wrong and disturbing manner that it's unsettling. That's how demons should look, of course." Publishers Weekly wrote: "this work has a style characteristic of other 1980s manga, with sparse dialogue, spectacular action sequences and gritty character art. The pencil shading and use of shadows lend an ominous tone." Campbell wrote: "You just can't know what 'attention to detail' means until you read Berserk—it's rare when it comes to what it has to offer to all the readers out there, so really it's no wonder that it stands out as much as it does." Campbell also commented: "The closest thing visually that Berserk could be compared to might be Claymore, another very good manga—but really Berserk is on a plain of its own." Writing for Advanced Media Network, Serdar Yegulalp said that the artwork of the first volumes are "a little rougher and less polished than the later ones," but that after the eighth volume "there is scarcely a page that doesn't look spectacular," adding that "Miura's loving attention to detail on most any page or panel is stupefying." Writing for ANN, Casey Brienza stated: "Miura's artwork is exquisite and, remarkably, drawn without the help of an army of assistants. And while he has been great right from the first page of volume one, he has improved over the many years of working on Berserk." In another review for Graphic Novel Reporter, Brieza wrote: "Unlike virtually all other commercially successful manga artists, Miura produces his artwork without assistants, and the exquisite detail of this erotic-grotesque, Dungeons & Dragons-esque high fantasy issues from his hand and his hand alone," adding that it is "one that appeals to men and women alike." Carlo Santos, reviewer from ANN, wrote: "Miura's complete command of light and shadow gives every moment an otherworldly quality—this is one of the few series that can honestly claim to transport its readers to another time and place—and the attention to backgrounds is a welcome sight when so many other artists are too lazy to be bothered." Kimlinger wrote that Miura's art "is among the most intricate, evocative and plain beautiful art ever to be put to page and arranged cinematically. He draws wonderfully expressive faces, awe-inspiring monsters, gorgeous armor and some of the finest gore to be found just about anywhere." Chetri described Miura's otherworld featured in the first arc as "something a drug-addled MC Escher would have painted," also noting homages to Hellraiser and H. P. Lovecraft's Cthulhu Mythos, and called Miura a "splendid storyteller whose artwork is stark and bold enough to bring the world of Guts to life magnificently." Writing for IGN, Bruna Penilhas commented that Miura's level of detail in his illustrations is "impressive from start to finish," praising the design and features of his characters, adding that he was able to "perfectly illustrate characteristics and feelings such as pain, anger and sadness." Alex Traub from The New York Times commented about the comparison of Miura's drawings to Hieronymus Bosch's paintings, particularly for Miura's images of "little human figures occupying sweeping fantastical landscapes," adding: "Mr. Miura was known for his spectacular, apocalyptic style; specific images—a humongous sword, a monster cloaked in shadow—are immediately recognizable to his fans."

Legacy
Berserk is regarded as one of the most influential dark fantasy works. Peter Fobian, in an essay of the legacy and impact of Berserk, called it a "monolith not only for anime and manga, but also fantasy literature, video games, you name it," comparing its level of influence to Blade Runner, further adding: "it's difficult to imagine what the world might look like without it, and the generations of creators the series inspired."

According to writer and editor Kazushi Shimada, series like Fullmetal Alchemist, Attack on Titan, Demon Slayer: Kimetsu no Yaiba or Jujutsu Kaisen would not have existed if not for Berserk. Some dark fantasy manga authors who have declared influence from Berserk include Hajime Isayama (Attack on Titan), Kazue Kato (Blue Exorcist) and Yana Toboso (Black Butler). Other authors influenced by Berserk include Makoto Yukimura (Vinland Saga), Yūki Tabata (Black Clover) and Ryōgo Narita (Baccano! and Durarara!!). Adi Shankar, showrunner of the Castlevania animated series, said in an interview that he would like to adapt Berserk, calling the "hyper-detailed beauty" of Miura's artwork a "true masterpiece", while Adam Deats, Castlevania assistant director, stated that the show was inspired by Berserk.

Critics like Gene Park of The Washington Post and Ramsey Isler of IGN stated that Berserk started a visual trend of characters wielding giant swords that spread to Cloud Strife from Final Fantasy VII, Dante from Devil May Cry, and Ichigo Kurosaki from Bleach.

Berserk has also inspired a number of video games, including the Dynasty Warriors series, the Final Fantasy series (considerably Final Fantasy VII and XIV), the Dark Souls series, Bloodborne, Sekiro: Shadows Die Twice, Elden Ring, and Capcom's Devil May Cry and Dragon's Dogma series.

Finnish heavy metal band Battle Beast have written songs about Berserk, including several on their 2013 self-titled album. When guitarist Anton Kabanen left Battle Beast in 2015, he formed Beast in Black and continues to write songs about the series. The deathcore band Brand of Sacrifice released the album God Hand in 2019. Both the band and album are hugely inspired by Berserk. In 2021, deathcore band Slaughter to Prevail released a music video for their song "Zavali Ebalo", which featured scenes from the Berserk 1997 anime series.

See also

Notes

References

External links

  
  
 

Berserk
Dark fantasy anime and manga
Dark Horse Comics titles
Demons in anime and manga
Dragons in popular culture
Digital Manga Publishing titles
Existentialist anime and manga
Hakusensha franchises
Hakusensha manga
High fantasy anime and manga
Manga adapted into films
Manga adapted into television series
Mythopoeia
Rape in fiction
Anime and manga about revenge
Seinen manga
Sword and sorcery anime and manga
Trolls in popular culture
War in anime and manga
Winner of Tezuka Osamu Cultural Prize (Award for Excellence)